History Is Made at Night may refer to:

 History Is Made at Night (1937 film)
 History Is Made at Night (1999 film)
 History Is Made at Night (song), a song from the musical TV series Smash